()
José Ramos (born June 30, 1987) is a Mexican footballer.

Career
Ramos signed with new USL Professional Division club Phoenix FC on February 6, 2013. He had previously played indoor soccer with Arizona Storm during their 2011-12 season.

References

External links
 USL Pro profile

1987 births
Living people
Mexican expatriate footballers
Mexican footballers
Phoenix FC players
Phoenix Rising FC players
Expatriate soccer players in the United States
USL Championship players
Association football defenders
Association football midfielders